Bike box may refer to either a:

Advanced stop line, a road marking facility at intersections to allow cyclists to advance ahead of other traffic
Bicycle locker, an individual storage facility for bicycles